This list of Art Deco buildings in Tasmania includes historically significant Art Deco buildings in Tasmania.

Art Deco is a loose term, that may include:
Interwar Free Classicism (Deco Free Classicism): using classical motifs largely as decoration, in a very stylised or abstracted manner, with little reference to the norms of the classical language
Jazz Moderne [Zig-Zag Moderne]: No particular classical references. Angular lines and vertical emphasis. Somewhat related to ‘Skyscraper Gothic’.
Streamline Moderne: No particular classical references. Curved lines and horizontal emphasis. Related to the ‘streamlining’ of contemporary forms of transport.

Office and commercial buildings
 Commonwealth Bank Building, Hobart, Elizabeth Street, Hobart
 Hobart Mercury Building, Hobart
 Hydro-Electric Commission Building, Davey Street, Hobart
 Prudential Insurance Building, Elizabeth Street, Hobart
 T&G Insurance Building, Hobart
 Original Myer Building, Liverpool Street, Hobart (Destroyed By fire 22 September 2007)
 Former Government Printer, 2-4 Salamanca Place, Hobart
 Holyman House, corner of Brisbane and George Street, Launceston
 Hotel Charles (Old Launceston General Hospital), Launceston
 Park Hotel, Invermay Road, Launceston
 Former Tasmania Savings Bank, Invermay Road, Launceston
 Holmes Building, corner Brisbane and Charles Street, Launceston
 Duncan House, Launceston
 Princess Theatre, Launceston
 Alfred Harrap Building, corner of Tamar and Cimitier Street, Launceston
 Shepherds Bakery, corner Quadrant and St John Street, Launceston
 Medibank House (Launceston Gas Company), St John Street, Launceston
 Lucks Corner, corner Patterson and George Street, Launceston
 Star Theatre (St Vincent De Pauls), Invermay Road, Launceston
 Rapson Tyre Factory, west end of Gleadow Street, Invermay, Launceston
 Deacons Corner, corner Lytton Street and Invermay Road, Invermay, Launceston
 Legacy House, Launceston

Institutional buildings
 Royal Hobart Hospital, Hobart

Tasmania
Buildings and structures in Tasmania
 
Art Deco buildings